West Bridgford Football Club are a football club based in West Bridgford, Nottinghamshire, England.

History
In the 2015-16 season the men's section of West Bridgford FC was promoted after finishing 3rd in the Nottinghamshire Senior League. and under the guidance of management duo and former players Stuart Robinson and Chris Marks they achieved their fifth promotion, subsequently joining and winning the step 6 - East Midlands Counties Football League
only six years after the men's section was officially formed.
They declined promotion due to a lack of facilities to the Midland Football League and remained in the East Midlands Counties Football League. They remained members of the league until it was disbanded at the end of the 2020–21 season, at which point they were transferred to Division One of the United Counties League.

Ground 
The club play at Regatta Way Sports Ground, which has a capacity of 1,000.

Honours
East Midlands Counties League
Winners 2016-17
Nottinghamshire Senior League
Division Two Runners-up 2011-12 (Promoted to Nottinghamshire Senior League Division One)
Division One Runners-up 2013-14 (Promoted to Nottinghamshire Senior League Premier Division)
Premier Division Runners-up 2014-15
Premier Division 3rd place 2015-16 (Promoted to East Midland Counties Football League)
Nottinghamshire F. A. Intermediate Cup 
Winners 2015-16
Runners-up 2011-12

Current Season East Midlands Counties Football League

Records
Best FA Cup performance: First qualifying round, 2020–21
Best FA Vase performance: Second round, 2016–17

Former players
Players that have played/managed in the Football League or higher, or any foreign equivalent to this level (i.e. fully professional league)
Mary Earps
Simon Francis
Shaun Harrad
Katie Holtham
Adam Newbold

References

External links
Official website

Football clubs in England
Football clubs in Nottinghamshire
West Bridgford
Nottinghamshire Senior League
East Midlands Counties Football League
United Counties League